Zygmunt Ginter (12 March 1916 – 1 March 1964) was a Polish ice hockey player. He played for Ognisko Wilno and Legia Warsaw during his career. He also played for the Polish national team at the 1948 Winter Olympics. He replaced Tadeusz Dolewski on the Olympic team right before the start of the tournament for reasons never made clear; it was only apparent that the switch was made some 50 years later, and Dolewski was listed as a participant in the Olympics, not Ginter.

References

External links
 

1916 births
1964 deaths
Ice hockey players at the 1948 Winter Olympics
Legia Warsaw (ice hockey) players
Olympic ice hockey players of Poland
People from Wolsztyn County
Sportspeople from Greater Poland Voivodeship
Polish ice hockey defencemen